Bouazza Feham (born April 11, 1986 in Oran) is an Algerian footballer. He currently played for MO Constantine in the Algerian Ligue 2 as a midfielder .

Club career
On June 9, 2011, Feham signed a one-year contract with USM Alger, joining them on a free transfer from ES Sétif.

International career
Feham first represented Algeria at the Under-20 level, taking part in a tournament in Rezé, France. He would later receive call ups to the Under-21 team and the Under-23 team, participating in the 2005 Islamic Games in Saudi Arabia.

On April 22, 2008, he was called up on stand-by for the Algerian A' National Team in its qualifier against Morocco. However, he did not end up playing in the game.

Honours

Club
 Won the Algerian League once with ES Sétif in 2009
 Won the North African Cup of Champions once with ES Sétif in 2009
 Won the North African Super Cup once with ES Sétif in 2010
 Won the Algerian Cup once with ES Sétif in 2010
 Won the North African Cup Winners Cup once with ES Sétif in 2010
 Finalist of the CAF Confederation Cup once with ES Sétif in 2009
 Won the Algerian Cup once with USM Alger in 2012–13
 Won the UAFA Club Cup once with USM Alger in 2012–13
 Won the Algerian Super Cup once with USM Alger in 2013
 Won the Ligue 1 once with USM Alger in 2013-14
 Won the Algerian Cup once with CR Belouizdad in 2017

Individual
 Chosen as Best Junior Player in Algeria by Le Buteur in 2005

References

External links
 Bouazza Feham unofficial website

1986 births
Algerian footballers
Living people
Footballers from Oran
ASM Oran players
MC Oran players
ES Sétif players
USM Alger players
USM Blida players
MO Béjaïa players
RC Relizane players
Al-Hazem F.C. players
Saudi First Division League players
Algerian Ligue Professionnelle 1 players
Algeria A' international footballers
Algeria under-23 international footballers
2011 African Nations Championship players
Algeria youth international footballers
Association football midfielders
21st-century Algerian people